Corentin Camille André Baron (23 May 1895 – 2 November 1973) was a French footballer and manager.

Playing career
Baron began his career with hometown club VGA Saint-Maur, later joining AS Française. In 1920, Baron joined Olympique de Paris, playing for the club until 1926, when they merged with Red Star Amical Club, forming Red Star Olympique. Baron played for the new club for four years, winning the Coupe de France in 1928, before joining Racing Club de France, where he finished his career in 1932.

On 22 April 1923, Baron made his only appearance for France, playing in a 2–2 draw against Switzerland.

Managerial career
Following his playing career, Baron moved into management, taking up the reigns at former club Racing Club de France. During his early managerial career Baron regularly moved from French Algeria to manage AS Saint Eugène, back to Racing Club de France, save for a spell with Haiti from 1953 to 1954. Baron won the Coupe de France twice with Racing Club, in 1945 and 1949. In 1956, Baron returned to Red Star Olympique, moving to Cannes a year later. In 1959, Baron was appointed manager of Greece, before returning to Red Star Olympique in 1960 for a year. In 1964, Baron moved back to the newly renamed Racing Club de Paris.

References

Sportspeople from Saint-Maur-des-Fossés
1895 births
1973 deaths
French footballers
Association football defenders
Association football midfielders
French football managers
French expatriate football managers
Ligue 1 players
Ligue 1 managers
France international footballers
Red Star F.C. players
Racing Club de France Football players
Racing Club de France Football managers
Haiti national football team managers
Red Star F.C. managers
Greece national football team managers
French expatriate sportspeople in Haiti
French expatriate sportspeople in Greece
Expatriate football managers in Greece
Expatriate football managers in Haiti
Footballers from Val-de-Marne